Satisfy may refer to:

Satisfy (horse) (foaled 1984), a New Zealand Thoroughbred racehorse
"Satisfy" (song), by Nero, 2014
"Satisfy", a song by Jerry Cantrell from Boggy Depot, 1998
Satisfy, an album by the Cover Girls, 1996
Satisfy, an album by Kathryn Scott, 2004

See also
"Satisfya", a  2013 song by Imran Khan
 Satisfaction (disambiguation)
 Satisfiability, a property of some mathematical formulas